Karavaram  is a village in Chirayinkeezhu  Taluk of Trivandrum district in the state of Kerala, India.

Demographics
 India census, Karavaram had a population of 16774 with 7948 males and 8826 females.

References

Villages in Thiruvananthapuram district